In the United Kingdom, a Police Federation is a statutory association that represents police officers. As policing is devolved, there are separate federations for each part of the United Kingdom:

Police Federation of England and Wales
Police Federation for Northern Ireland
Scottish Police Federation
There is also a federation for the Ministry of Defence Police:
Defence Police Federation